The following is a list of banks incorporated in Monaco:

Major 

 Barclays Bank plc Monaco
 Credit Foncier de Monaco  SWIFT: CFMOMCMXXXX
 Bank Julius Baer (Monaco) S.A.M.
 UBS (Monaco)  SWIFT: UBSWMCMXXXX
 SG Private Banking (Monaco)  SWIFT: SGBTMCMCXXX
 Credit Suisse (Monaco)  SWIFT: CRESMCMXXXX
 EFG Eurofinancière d'Investissements  SWIFT: EFGBMCMCXXX
 Compagnie Monégasque de Banque  SWIFT: CMBMMCMXXXX
 Banque de Gestion Edmond de Rothschild - Monaco  SWIFT: BERLMCMCXXX
 BNP Paribas Private Bank Monaco  SWIFT: BPPBMCMCXXX
 HSBC Private Bank (Monaco)  SWIFT: BLICMCMCXXX
 Union Bancaire Privée  SWIFT: UBPGMCMXXXX

Other 
Banque J. Safra (Monaco)  SWIFT: BJSBMCMXXXX
Banque Havilland  SWIFT: HAVLMCMXXX
BSI Monaco  SWIFT: BSILMCMCXXX
Crédit Mobilier de Monaco  (SWIFT: CMMDMCM1XXX not connected)
Fortis Banque Monaco  SWIFT: FTSBMCMCXXX
ING Bank (Monaco)  SWIFT: INGBMCMCXXX
KB Luxembourg (Monaco)  SWIFT: KBLXMCMCXXX
Martin Maurel Sella - Banque Privée-Monaco  (SWIFT: MMSEMCM1XXX not connected)
Monte Paschi Monaco  SWIFT: MONTMCMCXXX

Defunct banks
Banque Monégasque de Gestion (acquired by EFG International)
Banque du Gothard (Monaco) (acquired by Bank Jacob Safra Switzerland in 2006)

References

Banks
Banks
Monaco
Monaco